Noko may refer to:

People 
 Noko (born 1962), English multi-instrumentalist musician, composer and producer
 Noko Matlou (born 1985), South African women's footballer
 Ishmael Noko (born 1943), southern African Lutheran priest who was the General Secretary of the Lutheran World Federation
 Noko, stage name of Ryōsuke Ōshima, lead vocalist for Shinsei Kamattechan

Other uses 
 Noko Jeans, a fashion company that import jeans from North Korea
 North Korea, a sovereign state in Asia